Mount Pleasant Commercial Historic District is a historic district located in Mount Pleasant, Utah, United States.  Consisting of buildings along U.S. Route 89 and State Route 116, it was listed on the National Register of Historic Places in 1979.

References

Buildings and structures in Sanpete County, Utah
Commercial buildings on the National Register of Historic Places in Utah
Buildings designated early commercial in the National Register of Historic Places
Historic districts on the National Register of Historic Places in Utah
Queen Anne architecture in Utah
Stick-Eastlake architecture in the United States
National Register of Historic Places in Sanpete County, Utah